Statistics of Swiss Super League in the 1921–22 season.

East

Table

Results

Central

Table

Results

West

Table

Results

Final

Table

Results 

|colspan="3" style="background-color:#D0D0D0" align=center|28 May 1922

|-
|colspan="3" style="background-color:#D0D0D0" align=center|18 June 1922

|-
|colspan="3" style="background-color:#D0D0D0" align=center|25 June 1922

Servette Genf won the championship.

Sources 
 Switzerland 1921-22 at RSSSF

Seasons in Swiss football
Swiss Football League seasons
1921–22 in Swiss football
Swiss